Robert-Matthew Chichkov (9 February 1884 – 11 November 1952) in Plovdiv, Bulgaria, was a priest, rector and teacher who was sentenced to death in the early 1950s.

He came from a large and fervent Latin rite Catholic family. He entered the Assumptionist high school seminary in Adrianopolis and entered the Assumptionist novitiate in Phanaraki, Turkey in 1900. His name in religion was Josaphat. He was ordained a priest in the Latin rite in Malines, Belgium, in 1909 after studying philosophy and theology at Louvain University.

Once back in Bulgaria, he taught at St. Augustine College in Plovdiv and at St. Michael College in Varna. Later he moved to Yambol where he served as superior and rector of the high school seminary of Saints Cyril and Methodius, as pastor of the local Latin rite parish, and as chaplain to the Oblate Sisters of the Assumption. In 1937 he returned to the college in Varna where he served as rector and teacher until he was arrested in 1951.

He was responsible for enlarging the Yambol seminary to include seminarians of both rites, Latin and Byzantine-Slav, and found ways to integrate students into one community. He organized fundraising activities for the institution and taught French to teachers, civil servants, and Bulgarian army officers.

He had a particular interest in the latest technology and introduced a ham radio and movie projector at the seminary.

Josaphat Chichkov was arrested in December 1951. After what international organizations universally considered a show trial which began on 29 September 1952 and ended with a guilty verdict and a death sentence on 3 October, Fr. Chickov, two of his Assumptionists companions, Fr. Kamen Vitchev and Fr. Pavel Djidjov, and a Passionist bishop, Most Rev. Eugene Bossilkov, were shot to death, without public notice, at 11:30 PM the evening of 11 November 1952.

Fr. Chichkov was declared a martyr for the faith and beatified by Pope John Paul II in Plovdiv on 26 May 2002.

On 28 July 2010 the Bulgarian parliament passed a law officially rehabilitating all of those who had been condemned by the People's Republic of Bulgaria in 1952, including Fr. Chichkov.

References

 Guissard, Lucien. The Assumptionists: From Past to Present, Bayard Publications, 2002.
 Gallay, Pierre. The Martyrdom of the Three Bulgarian Assumptionists, Bayard Service Edition, 2002.
 Royal, Robert. The Catholic Martyrs of the Twentieth Century: A Comprehensive World History, The Crossroad Publishing Company, New York, 2000.
 Holzer, Bernard and Michel, Jean-Baptiste, Les Rideaux Rouges de Sofia, Editions Bayard, 2003.
 Pope John Paul II, homily delivered in Plovdiv, Bulgaria, 26 May 2002.

Bulgarian beatified people
20th-century Roman Catholic martyrs
Bulgarian Roman Catholic priests
1952 deaths
1884 births
People executed by the People's Republic of Bulgaria
People executed by Bulgaria by firing squad
20th-century Roman Catholic priests